Artur Yevgenyevich Farion (born 27 January 1995) is a Russian former football player.

Club career
He made his professional debut in the Russian Professional Football League for FC Arsenal-2 Tula on 12 July 2014 in a game against FC Avangard Kursk.

He made his Russian Premier League debut on 21 March 2015 for FC Arsenal Tula in a game against PFC CSKA Moscow.

References

External links
 

1995 births
Living people
Sportspeople from Tula, Russia
Russian footballers
Russia youth international footballers
Association football defenders
FC Arsenal Tula players
Russian Premier League players
Russian Second League players